The 1988–89 Northern Premier League season was the 21st in the history of the Northern Premier League, a football competition in England. Teams were divided into two divisions; the Premier and the First. It was known as the HFS Loans League for sponsorship reasons.

Premier Division

The Premier Division featured three new teams:

 Shepshed Charterhouse transferred from Southern League Premier Division
 Fleetwood Town promoted as champions from Division One
 Stalybridge Celtic promoted as runners up from Division One

League table

Results

Division One

The Division One featured five new teams:

 Workington relegated from Premier Division
 Colne Dynamoes promoted as champions of the NWCFL Division One
 Bishop Auckland promoted from Northern League Division One
 Whitley Bay promoted from Northern League Division One
 Newtown promoted from Mid Wales League

League table

Promotion and relegation 

In the twenty-first season of the Northern Premier League Barrow (as champions) were automatically promoted to the Football Conference. Meanwhile, Worksop Town were relegated; these two sides were replaced by First Division winners Colne Dynamoes and second placed Bishop Auckland. Sutton Town left the First Division at the end of the season and were replaced by newly admitted Emley and Rossendale United.

Cup Results 
Challenge Cup:

Mossley 2–1 Fleetwood Town

President's Cup:

Bangor City 5–1 South Liverpool

Northern Premier League Shield: Between Champions of NPL Premier Division and Winners of the NPL Cup.

Mossley bt. Barrow

References

External links 
 Northern Premier League Tables at RSSSF

Northern Premier League seasons
6